The Southern dynasties describe a succession of Chinese empires that coexisted alongside a series of Northern dynasties. The era is generally described as the Northern and Southern dynasties, lasting from 420–589 AD after the  Jin and before the Sui dynasty.

The Southern dynasties were as follows:
 Liu Song (420–479 AD)
 Southern Qi (479–502 AD)
 Liang dynasty (502–557 AD)
 Chen dynasty (557–589 AD)

The Western Liang (555–587 AD) was a rump successor to the Liang dynasty and is typically not regarded as a legitimate regime that bore the Mandate of Heaven.

Emperors of the Southern dynasties

Emperors of the Western Liang dynasty (555–587 AD)
The Western Liang is also sometimes called the "Later Liang" (not to be confused with the Later Liang of the Five Dynasties and Ten Kingdoms period).

See also
List of emperors of the Northern dynasties
Northern and Southern dynasties
Chinese sovereign

Lists of Chinese monarchs
Lists of leaders of China
Lists of Chinese people